The men's hammer throw event at the 2011 Summer Universiade was held on 17 August.

Results

References
Results

Hammer
2011